Calobatina is a genus of stilt-legged flies in the family Micropezidae.

Species
Calobatina geometra (Robineau-Desvoidy, 1830)

References

Micropezidae
Nerioidea genera